The enzyme α-amino-acid esterase (EC 3.1.1.43) catalyzes the reaction 

an α-amino acid ester + H2O  an α-amino acid + an alcohol

This enzyme belongs to the family of hydrolases, specifically those acting on carboxylic ester bonds.  The systematic name is α-amino-acid-ester aminoacylhydrolase. This enzyme is also called α-amino acid ester hydrolase.

Structural studies

References

 
 
 

EC 3.1.1
Enzymes of known structure